Colonel Sir Joseph Alfred Bradney,  (11 January 1859 – 21 July 1933) was a British soldier, historian and archaeologist, best known for his multivolume A History of Monmouthshire from the Coming of the Normans into Wales down to the Present Time.

Life
Joseph Bradney was born at Greet, Tenbury Wells, Shropshire, and educated at Harrow and Trinity College, Cambridge.
 He acquired, partly by inheritance and partly purchase, Tal-y-coed Court, an estate at Talycoed, Llanvihangel-Ystern-Llewern, near Monmouth, where he settled at an early age. He entered the army, serving as captain of the Royal Monmouth Royal Engineers Militia from 1882 to 1892, and lieutenant-colonel commanding the 2nd Battalion, Monmouthshire Regiment from 1892 to 1912. In the Territorial Force Reserve from 1912 to 1919, he served in France in 1917–18.

Bradney was High Sheriff of Monmouthshire in 1889, Deputy lieutenant of the county, and a county councillor from 1898 to 1924.  He was also a governor and on the Council of the National Library of Wales and the National Museum of Wales. He was a member of the Royal Commission on the Ancient and Historical Monuments of Wales. He was appointed a Companion of the Bath in 1911, and knighted in 1924.

He wrote extensively on the history of Monmouthshire, his major work being A History of Monmouthshire from the Coming of the Normans into Wales down to the Present Time, published in twelve volumes between 1904 and 1933. A final volume, drawing on his notes, was published posthumously. The books have been described as a "monumental survey, extensively illustrated and containing dozens of pedigrees, [which remains] a basic reference work essential for the serious study of local history or genealogy in Monmouthshire." He shared an interest in vulgar limericks with the antiquarian Egerton Phillimore though Bradney's letters to Phillimore were often written in Latin.

He was married twice, first to Rosa Jenkins (d. 1927), and then to Florence Prothero. A Latin tablet in the Church of St Michael and All Angels, Llanvihangel-Ystern-Llewern records his achievements.

Works
Genealogical memoranda relating to the families of Hopkins of Llanfihangel Ystern Llewern, Co. Monmouth, and Probyn of Newland, Co. Gloucester, 1889
A History of Monmouthshire: From the coming of the Normans into Wales down to the present time, 4 vols, 1904-1933
(ed.) The diary of Walter Powell of Llantilio Crossenny in the county of Monmouth, gentleman 1603-1654, 1907
(ed.) Llyfr Baglan : or The book of Baglan, by John Williams, London: Mitchell, Hughes and Clarke, 1910
 A History of the Free Grammar School in the Parish of Llantilio-Crosseny in the County of Monmouh, 1924

A History of Monmouthshire

Bradney's History comprised twelve volumes, divided by the traditional administrative areas of Hundreds. The work covered six of the seven hundreds of Monmouthshire.

 Volume I Part 1, The Hundred of Skenfrith, (1904) OCLC 896129125
 Volume I Part 2, The Hundred of Abergavenny, (1906), OCLC 895940655
 Volume II Part 1, The Hundred of Raglan, (1911), OCLC 895940653
 Volume II Part 2, The Hundred of Trelech, (1913), OCLC 895939552
 Volume III Part 1, The Hundred of Usk, (1921) OCLC 502610834
 Volume III Part 2, The Hundred of Usk, (1923), OCLC 502610826
 Volume IV Part 1, The Hundred of Caldicot, (1929), OCLC 896116356
 Volume IV Part 2 The Hundred of Caldicot, (1932), OCLC 502610829
 Four volumes consisting of a List of Subscribers, Addenda and Corrigenda, and Indices of Names and Places.

Between 1991 and 1993, the history was reprinted by Academy Books, and subsequently the Merton Priory Press, as an 80% sized facsimile. The work was arranged slightly differently to the original history, the indices were included in their respective Parts, and a fifth volume covering the last Hundred of Newport, was compiled from Bradney's manuscript notes by Dr Madeleine Gray. The re-ordered works were:

 Volume 1 Part 1, The Hundred of Skenfrith, (1991)  
 Volume 1 Part 2a, The Hundred of Abergavenny, (1992), 
 Volume 1 Part 2b, The Hundred of Abergavenny, (1992), 
 Volume 2 Part 1, The Hundred of Raglan, (1992) 
 Volume 2 Part 2, The Hundred of Trelech, (1992), 
 Volume 3 Part 1, The Hundred of Usk, (1993), 
 Volume 3 Part 2, The Hundred of Usk, (1993), 
 Volume 4 Part 1, The Hundred of Caldicot, (1994), 
 Volume 4 Part 2 The Hundred of Caldicot, (1994), 
 Volume 5 The Hundred of Newport, (1993),

Footnotes

References

Sources

External links

1859 births
1933 deaths
People educated at Harrow School
Alumni of Trinity College, Cambridge
Companions of the Order of the Bath
Deputy Lieutenants of Monmouthshire
Monmouthshire Regiment officers
19th-century British historians
English archaeologists
Fellows of the Society of Antiquaries of London
History of Monmouthshire
Welsh justices of the peace
High Sheriffs of Monmouthshire
Military personnel from Shropshire
20th-century British historians